Parliamentary elections are scheduled to be held in Georgia in 2024.

Electoral system
The Parliament of Georgia is composed of 150 members, elected for a term of four years.

On 26 September 2017 Parliament adopted the much-debated constitutional amendments with 117 voting in favor. Major systemic changes include a move to a fully proportional system by 2024 with a 5% threshold. Previously, the 150-seat parliament was elected through a mixed system, with 77 elected seats by proportional representation (5% threshold) and 73 in single-member majoritarian constituencies.

As in 2020, the elections will be held with a gender quota of 25%. Political parties must include women in every fourth position on their party lists. 

On 6 February, 2023, the Central Election Commission of Georgia adopted a decree introducing an electronic voter registration and voting system on most of the polling stations.

Opinion polls

References

Parliamentary
Georgia
Parliamentary elections in Georgia (country)